The 2010 Houston Astros season was the 49th season in the history of the franchise. The team, managed by first-year manager Brad Mills, began their 11th season at Minute Maid Park and 46th as the Astros on April 5. After finishing 74–88 the year before in 5th place, the Astros finished 76–86 in 4th place in 2010. This was the best before the Astros moved to American League in 2013.

The Astros struggled in April. After starting the season 0–8, they finished April 8–14, despite a 3.92 ERA from their pitching staff. They lost the last four in April, as well as the first four in May for a second 8-game losing streak. They finished May with a 9–20 mark to give the Astros a 17–34 record over the first two months. The Astros rebounded to win 8 of their first 10 games in June, but struggled in Interleague play, going 2–10 against the AL in June to finish 14–14 in June.

The Astros lone representative to the All-star Game was Michael Bourn, who was batting .255 with 28 stolen bases. The Astros traded away Roy Oswalt and Lance Berkman in late July for a total of 5 prospects, and ultimately the Astros went 13–11 in July. The Astros would go 34–27 after trading away Oswalt and Berkman. The Astros won the final four games of July and the first three of August for a season-high 7-game winning streak, capped by a season-high 18–4 win over the St. Louis Cardinals. The Astros would have their best month of the year in August by going 17–12, including a four-game sweep of the Philadelphia Phillies, the first time the Phillies were swept in Citizens Bank Park. The Astros would experience their third consecutive winning month in September, going 14–13, however the poor months of April and May kept them out of contention down the stretch. They finished the season in Chicago to face the Cubs, losing 2 of 3, but still finishing 4th ahead of the Cubs.

Jeff Keppinger led the Astros in batting average with a .288 clip, while Hunter Pence led them in home runs (25) and RBIs (91). Brett Myers led the Astros in wins (14), ERA (3.14), and strikeouts (180) in a career year, where he went 6 innings in his first 32 starts. Michael Bourn his 2nd consecutive Gold Glove Award to go along with his All-Star selection.

Regular season

April

The Astros began 2010 playing the San Francisco Giants at home, but lost 5–2 on Opening Day to Tim Lincecum, who pitched 7 shutout innings and earning the win for the Giants. The Astros would drop the second one as well 4–0 to Barry Zito, who pitched six shutout innings, and got swept at home the next game 10–4 after giving up 2 runs in the eighth and 4 in the ninth. They lost to J. A. Happ, who pitched five shutout innings and would be traded in July to the Astros, and the Philadelphia Phillies 8–0 in the first game. The Astros had a 5–4 lead going into the 7th inning in the second game, but gave up 3 runs in the 7th and 2 in the 9th and lost 9–6. In the final game of the series, the Phillies's Roy Halladay pitched a complete game allowing only one run to win 2–1, to sweep the Astros and give them a six-game losing streak. Going on the road for the first time this season, the Astros visited Busch Stadium to face the St. Louis Cardinals for a three-game series. The Astros lost 5–0 in game one of the series, as Adam Wainwright pitched 8 shutout innings to get the win. In the second game, the Astros scored 1 in the first and the Cardinals scored 2 in the first. Those would be the only runs scored in the game, as the Cardinals won 2–1.  The Astros were in danger of being swept by the Cardinals, until the Astros won 5–1 on the back of Bud Norris's 5 innings, allowing only 1 unearned run. This win snapped an 8-game losing streak to begin the season, in which they failed to score in 3 of the games and scored 1 run or less 5 times. The Astros went to Wrigley Field in Chicago to face the Chicago Cubs and dropped the first one 7–2, giving up 6 runs in the bottom of the 7th. The Astros won 4–3 in the next game, with Roy Oswalt throwing 7 shutout innings. In the next game, the Astros won a 10-inning game in the series finale 3–2, rallying for 1 run each in the 8th, 9th, and 10th innings, with the winning run scoring on a Pedro Feliz sacrifice fly, to win their first series of the season.

The Astros would head back home for 9 games, starting with 3 against the Florida Marlins. The Astros won the first game 7–5, scoring 3 in the bottom of the 8th to break a 4–4 tie. In the next game, the Astros won 5–4, on a Geoff Blum 2-RBI triple to rally the Astros from a 4–3 deficit. In the next game, the Marlins won 5–1 after putting up 3 runs in the 1st, snapping the Astros's 4-game winning streak. The Astros would then face the Pittsburgh Pirates at home, and won the first game 4–3. In the next game, a Lance Berkman line drive would hit the pitcher Chris Jakubauskas in the head. Fortunately, he would be fine, after being hospitalized. The Astros would win that game 5–2. In the final game of the series, the Astros put up 10 runs and won 10–3, despite Pittsburgh outhitting the Astros 14–10, to secure the Astros first series sweep of the season, and their third consecutive series win. The Astros outscored the Pirates 19–8 on the backs of great pitching by Roy Oswalt, Wandy Rodríguez, and Brett Myers, who combined to give up only 5 earned runs over 20.1 innings pitched over the course of the series. After the last game, the Astros had won 7 out of their last 8 games and were 8–10, in 3rd place in the NL Central, and only 3 games back from the Cardinals. Unfortunately for the Astros, this hot streak would end soon. In the next game against the Cincinnati Reds, the Astros lost 6–2. In the next game, the Astros rallied for 3 in the 9th but still lost 6–4. In the series finale, the Astros lost 4–2, being swept for the third time in seven series this season. Going to Turner Field to face the Atlanta Braves, and lost 4–2 again to conclude April with an 8–14 mark, and a four-game losing streak.

May

The Astros would continue to struggle into May, losing 10–1 to the Braves. In the series finale, the Braves finished the sweep by winning 7–1, giving the Astros their sixth loss in a row. Going back home, the Astros lost to the Arizona Diamondbacks 9–1, failing to score more than one run for the third consecutive game. In the second game, the Diamondbacks won 1–0 from 6.2 shutout innings from Ian Kennedy. This gave the Astros an eight-game losing streak, during which they had been outscored 45–13. In game three, the Astros walked-off in the bottom of the 9th off a 2-run home run from Carlos Lee, giving the Astros a 4–2 win. In the last game, the Astros lost 6–3 after falling 5–0 back after the Diamondbacks finished hitting in the fourth inning. In the first game against the San Diego Padres, Mat Latos pitched eight shutout innings allowing only two hits as the Astros lost 7–0, and only recording 3 hits. The second game was a pitcher's duel, with the Astros losing 2–1, and the starters, Jon Garland for the Padres and Felipe Paulino for the Astros, combined to allow one earned run in 14 innings between them. The Astros avoided the sweep with a 4–3 win in 11 innings, on a Hunter Pence walk-off hit to drive in Berkman. The Astros went to St. Louis to play the Cardinals and won the first game 6–3, thanks in part to a 4-run 7th inning. The Astros won for the third straight game 9–6 in the next game with another big inning, the one a 5-run 4th inning. The Astros got their third game in a row in which they scored four or more in an inning, winning 4–1 with Pence getting a 3-run home run. After the sweep, the Astros went to AT&T Park to face the Giants with a four-game winning streak, but lost 9–3 in the opener. The second game was a rematch of opening day pitchers Lincecum and Oswalt, with Lincecum winning 2–1 off of a 2-run home run off the bat of Juan Uribe. The Giants won another close game 4–3 against the Astros to seal the three-game sweep.

The Astros went to Dodger Stadium to play the Los Angeles Dodgers, losing the first game 6–2. Bud Norris would get hit with six earned runs in the next game, as the Astros lost 7–3 to conclude the short two-game series, with the Astros getting swept for the second consecutive series. The Astros came back home to face the Colorado Rockies for another two-game series, and won the first game 7–3, with a 4-run 8th involving a Jeff Keppinger 3-run double. In the next game, the Astros only got three hits for the second time this month, with Ubaldo Jiménez starting and going seven innings, as the Rockies won 4–0 for the series split. The Astros kicked off Interleague Play against the Tampa Bay Rays, winning 2–1 despite a complete game thrown by Rays starter Matt Garza. The Rays would win game two of the series 4–2, though, to tie the series at one each. In contrast to the first two games, which were low-scoring, the series finale was a high-scorer, with the Rays winning 10–6. The Astros went to Miller Park to play the Milwaukee Brewers, losing 6–1 against former Astro Randy Wolf. The Astros got a great start from Oswalt, who pitched eight shutout innings, and won 5–0. The Astros lost the series finale 4–3 in 10 innings, with Rickie Weeks drawing a walk-off walk against Matt Lindstrom to win the game, after Lindstrom gave up the game-tying run in the bottom of the 9th. The Astros traveled to Great American Ball Park to face the Reds, losing 15–6 against Sam LeCure, who was making his Major League debut. The Reds continued to score runs next game, scoring 12 runs as the Reds won 12–2. In the next game, Paulino did what Wandy Rodríguez and Brian Moehler, who started the first two games, failed to do: shut down the Reds batters. Paulino pitched eight shutout innings but did not get the win as the Astros did not score until a Berkman 2-RBI double in the top of the 10th, as the Astros won 2–0. To finish May, the Astros lost 14–4 to the Washington Nationals back home, with Oswalt being ejected in the 3rd inning, though Gustavo Chacín hit his first career home run for his first career hit. The Astros finished May with a 9–20 mark, and a 17–34 mark on the season overall.

Season standings

Record vs. opponents

Game log

|- bgcolor="ffbbbb"
| 1 || April 5 || Giants || 5–2 || Lincecum (1–0) || Oswalt (0–1) || Wilson (1) || 43,836 || 0–1
|- bgcolor="ffbbbb"
| 2 || April 6 || Giants || 3–0 || Zito (1–0) || Rodríguez (0–1) || Wilson (2) || 24,237 || 0–2
|- bgcolor="ffbbbb"
| 3 || April 7 || Giants || 10–4 || Affeldt (1–0) || Gervacio (0–1) || || 21,599 || 0–3
|- bgcolor="ffbbbb"
| 4 || April 9 || Phillies || 8–0 || Happ (1–0) || Norris (0–1) || || 27,288 || 0–4
|- bgcolor="ffbbbb"
| 5 || April 10 || Phillies  || 9–6 || Moyer (1–0) || Lyon (0–1) || || 35,138 || 0–5
|- bgcolor="ffbbbb"
| 6 || April 11 || Phillies  || 2–1 || Halladay (2–0) || Oswalt (0–2) || || 28,619 || 0–6
|- bgcolor="ffbbbb"
| 7 || April 12 || @ Cardinals || 5–0 || Wainwright (2–0) || Rodríguez (0–2) || || 46,918 || 0–7
|- bgcolor="ffbbbb"
| 8 || April 14 || @ Cardinals || 2–1 || Penny (1–0) || Myers (0–1) || Franklin (3) || 35,883 || 0–8
|- bgcolor="bbffbb"
| 9 || April 15 || @ Cardinals || 5–1 || Norris (1–1) || Lohse (0–1) || || 35,371 || 1–8
|- bgcolor="ffbbbb"
| 10 ||	April 16 || Cubs || 7–2 || Silva (1–0) || Paulino (0–1) || || 37,291 || 1–9
|- bgcolor="bbffbb"
| 11 ||	April 17 || Cubs || 4–3 || Oswalt (1–2) || Gorzelanny (0–1) || Lindstrom (1) || 40,471 || 2–9
|- bgcolor="bbffbb"
| 12 || April 18 || Cubs || 3 – 2 (10) || Byrdak (1–0) || Marshall (0–1) || Lindstrom (2) || 39,506 || 3–9
|- bgcolor="bbffbb"
| 13 || April 20 || Marlins || 7–5 || Lyon (1–1) || Wood (0–1) || Lindstrom (3) || 24,135 || 4–9
|- bgcolor="bbffbb"
| 14 || April 21 || Marlins || 5–4 || López (1–0) || Badenhop (0–2) || Lindstrom (4) || 22,607 || 5–9
|- bgcolor=#ffbbbb
| 15 || April 22 || Marlins || 5–1 || Sánchez (1–1) || Paulino (0–2) || || 21,802 || 5–10
|- bgcolor="bbffbb"
| 16 || April 24 || Pirates || 4–3 || Oswalt (2–2) || Maholm (1–2) || Lindstrom (5) || 30,018 || 6–10
|- bgcolor="bbffbb"
| 17 || April 24 || Pirates || 5–2 || Rodríguez (1–2) || Jakubauskas (0–1) || Lindstrom (6) || 30,562 || 7–10
|- bgcolor="bbffbb"
| 18 || April 25 || Pirates || 10–3 || Myers (1–1) || Morton (0–4) || || 27,210 || 8–10
|- bgcolor="#ffbbbb"
| 19 || April 27 || Reds || 6–2 || Harang (1–3) || Norris (1–2) ||  || 22,467 || 8–11
|- bgcolor="#ffbbbb"
| 20 || April 28 || Reds || 6–4 || Leake (2–0) || Paulino (0–3) ||  || 21,035 || 8–12
|- bgcolor="ffbbbb"
| 21 || April 29 || Reds || 4–2 || Arroyo (1–2) || Oswalt (2–3) || Cordero (8) || 21,493 || 8–13
|- bgcolor="ffbbbb"
| 22 || April 30 || @ Braves || 4–2 || Hanson (2–2) || Myers (1–2) || Wagner (2) || 30,082 || 8–14
|-

|- bgcolor="ffbbbb"
| 23 || May 1 || @ Braves || 10–1 || Hudson (2–1) || Rodríguez (1–3) || || 27,035 || 8–15
|- bgcolor="ffbbbb"
| 24 || May 2 || @ Braves || 7–1 || Lowe (4–2) || Norris (1–3)  || ||25,665 || 8–16
|- bgcolor="ffbbbb"
| 25 || May 3 || Diamondbacks || 9–1 || Valdez (1–0) ||  Paulino (0–4) || || 20,370 || 8–17
|- bgcolor="ffbbbb"
| 26 || May 4 || Diamondbacks || 1–0 || Kennedy (2–1) ||  Oswalt (2–4) || Qualls (5) || 22,661 || 8–18
|- bgcolor="bbffbb"
| 27 || May 5 || Diamondbacks || 4–2 || Lindstrom (1–0) ||  Gutiérrez (0–4) || || 21,030 || 9–18
|- bgcolor="ffbbbb"
| 28 || May 6 || Diamondbacks || 6–3 || Haren (4–1) || Rodríguez (1–4) || || 21,019 || 9–19
|- bgcolor="ffbbbb"
| 29 || May 7 || Padres || 7–0 || Latos (2-3) || Norris (1–4) || || 25,586 || 9–20
|- bgcolor="ffbbbb"
| 30 || May 8 || Padres || 2–1 || Garland (4-2) || Paulino (0–5) || Bell (8) || 27,038 || 9–21
|- bgcolor="bbffbb"
| 31 || May 9 || Padres || 4 – 3 (11) || Lyon (2–1) || Webb (0-1) || Capps (13) || 23,526 || 10–21
|- bgcolor="bbffbb"
| 32 || May 11 || @ Cardinals || 6–3 || Myers (2–2) || Penny (3–3) || Lindstrom (7) || 35,875 || 11–21
|- bgcolor="bbffbb"
| 33 || May 12 || @ Cardinals || 9–6 || Rodríguez (2–4)  || Lohse (0–3) || Lindstrom (8) || 36,342 || 12–21
|- bgcolor="bbffbb"
| 34 || May 13 || @ Cardinals || 4–1 || Norris (2–4) || Carpenter (4–1) || Lindstrom (9) || 39,026 || 13–21
|- bgcolor="ffbbbb"
| 35 || May 14 || @ Giants || 8–2 || Wellemeyer (2–3) || Paulino (0–6) || || 38,650 || 13–22
|- bgcolor="ffbbbb"
| 36 || May 15 || @ Giants || 2–1 || Lincecum (5–0) || Oswalt (2–5) || Wilson (8) || 40,060 || 13–23
|- bgcolor="ffbbbb"
| 37 || May 16 || @ Giants || 4–3 || Zito (6–1) || Myers (2–3) || Wilson (9) || 40,582 || 13–24
|- bgcolor="ffbbbb"
| 38 || May 17 || @ Dodgers || 6–2 || Ely (2–1) || Rodríguez (2–5) || || 35,282 || 13–25
|- bgcolor="ffbbbb"
| 39 || May 18 || @ Dodgers || 7–3 || Kuroda (5–1) || Norris (2–5) || || 55,662 || 13–26
|- bgcolor="bbffbb"
| 40 || May 19 || Rockies || 7–3 || Lyon (3–1) || Rogers (0–2) || || 25,200 || 14–26
|- bgcolor="ffbbbb"
| 41 || May 20 || Rockies || 4–0 || Jiménez (8–1) || Oswalt (2–6) || || 25,932 || 14–27
|- bgcolor="bbffbb"
| 42 || May 21 || Rays || 2–1 || Myers (3–3) || Garza (5–2) || Lindstrom (10) || 27,601 || 15–27
|- bgcolor="ffbbbb"
| 43 || May 22 || Rays || 4–2 || Niemann (4–0) || Rodríguez (2–6) || Soriano (12) || 33,778 || 15–28
|- bgcolor="ffbbbb"
| 44 || May 23 || Rays || 10–6 || Price (7–1) || Moehler (0–1) || Soriano (13) || 28,801 || 15–29
|- bgcolor="ffbbbb"
| 45 || May 25 || @ Brewers || 6–1 || Wolf (4–4) || Paulino (0–7) || || 27,363 || 15–30
|- bgcolor="bbffbb"
| 46 || May 26 || @ Brewers || 5–0 || Oswalt (3–6) || Narveson (4–2) || || 30,151 || 16–30
|- bgcolor="ffbbbb"
| 47 || May 27 || @ Brewers || 4 – 3 (10) || Axford (1–0) || Lindstrom (1–1) || || 34,355 || 16–31
|- bgcolor="ffbbbb"
| 48 || May 28 || @ Reds || 15–6 || LeCure (1–0) || Rodríguez (2–7) ||  || 30,813 || 16–32
|- bgcolor="ffbbbb"
| 49 || May 29 || @ Reds || 12–2 || Harang (4–5) || Moehler (0–2) ||  || 36,918 || 16–33
|- bgcolor="bbffbb"
| 50 || May 30 || @ Reds || 2 – 0  (10) || Lyon (4–1) || Owings (3–1) || Lindstrom (11) || 36,038 || 17–33
|- bgcolor="ffbbbb"
| 51 || May 31 || Nationals || 14–4 || Atilano (5–1) || Oswalt (3–7) || || 34,704 || 17–34
|-

|- bgcolor="bbffbb"
| 52 || June 1 || Nationals || 8–7 || López (2–0) || Capps (0–2) || || 25,249 || 18–34
|- bgcolor="bbffbb"
| 53 || June 2 || Nationals || 5–1 || Rodríguez (3–7) || Lannan (2–3) || || 26,736 || 19–34
|- bgcolor="bbffbb"
| 54 || June 3 || Nationals  || 6–4 || Lindstrom (2–1) || Capps (0–3) || || 21,814 || 20–34
|- bgcolor="bbffbb"
| 55 || June 4 || Cubs || 3–1 || Paulino (1-7) || Zambrano (1-4) || Lindstrom (12) || 28,784 || 21-34
|- bgcolor="ffbbbb"
| 56 || June 5 || Cubs || 8–5 || Dempster (4-5) || Oswalt (3-8) || Mármol (12) || 34,241 || 21-35
|- bgcolor="bbffbb"
| 57 || June 6 || Cubs || 6–3 || Myers (4-3) || Wells (3-4) || Lindstrom (13) || 29,493 || 22-35
|- bgcolor="ffbbbb"
| 58 || June 7 || @ Rockies || 5–1 || Hammel (3-3) || Rodríguez (3-8) || Corpas (7) || 28,251 || 22-36
|- bgcolor="bbffbb"
| 59 || June 8 || @ Rockies || 4–3 || López (3-0) || Belisle (1-2) || Lindstrom (14) || 26,201 || 23-36
|- bgcolor="bbffbb"
| 60 || June 9 || @ Rockies || 6–2 (10) || Lyon (5-1) || Belisle (1-3) ||  || 27,114 || 24-36
|- bgcolor="bbffbb"
| 61 || June 10 || @ Rockies || 5–4 || Oswalt (4-8) || Chacín (3-5) || Lyon (1) || 28,329 || 25-36
|- bgcolor="ffbbbb"
| 62 || June 11 || @ Yankees || 4–3 || Pettite (8-1) || Myers (4-4) || Rivera (15) || 46,883 || 25-37
|- bgcolor="ffbbbb"
| 63 || June 12 || @ Yankees || 9–3 || Vasquez (6-5) || Rodríguez (3-9) || || 46,159 || 25-38
|- bgcolor="ffbbbb"
| 64 || June 13 || @ Yankees || 9–5 || Hughes (9-1) || Moehler (0-3) || || 46,832 || 25-39
|- bgcolor="ffbbbb"
| 65 || June 15 || @ Royals || 15–7 || Texeira (1-1) || Paulino (1-8) || || 24,862 || 25-40
|- bgcolor="bbffbb"
| 66 || June 16 || @ Royals || 4–2 || Oswalt (5-8) || Chen (3-1) || Lindstrom (15) || 17,675 || 26-40
|- bgcolor="ffbbbb"
| 67 || June 17 || @ Royals || 5–2 || Marte (2-0) || Myers (4-5) || Soria (16) || 16,255 || 26-41
|- bgcolor="ffbbbb"
| 68 || June 18 || Rangers || 9–3 || Feldman (5-6) || Rodríguez (3-10) || || 33,951 || 26-42
|- bgcolor="ffbbbb"
| 69 || June 19 || Rangers || 5–1 || Lewis (7-4) || Moehler (0-4) || || 41,060 || 26-43
|- bgcolor="ffbbbb"
| 70 || June 20 || Rangers || 5–4 (10) || Ray (2-0) || Daigle (0-1) || Feliz (19) || 33,753 || 26-44
|- bgcolor="ffbbbb"
| 71 || June 22 || Giants || 3–1 || Lincecum (8-2)  || Oswalt (5-9) || Wilson (20) || 29,777 || 26-45
|- bgcolor="bbffbb"
| 72 || June 23 || Giants || 6–3 || Myers (5-5) || Zito (7-4) || Lindstrom (16) || 29,311 || 27-45
|- bgcolor="bbffbb"
| 73 || June 24 || Giants || 7–5 || Rodríguez (4-10) || Cain (6-6) || Lindstrom (17) || 26,662 || 28-45
|- bgcolor="bbffbb"
| 74 || June 25 || @ Rangers || 7–4 || Moehler (1-4) || Lewis (7-5) || Lindstrom (18) || 43,457 || 29-45
|- bgcolor="ffbbbb"
| 75 || June 26 || @ Rangers || 7–2 || Wilson (6-3) || Banks (0-1) || || 28,951 || 29-46
|- bgcolor="ffbbbb"
| 76 || June 27 || @ Rangers || 10–1 || Hunter (4-0) || Oswalt (5-10) || || 37,487 || 29-47
|- bgcolor="bbffbb"
| 77 || June 28 || @ Brewers || 9–5 || Chacín (1-0) || Coffey (2-2) || || 27,908 || 30-47
|- bgcolor="ffbbbb"
| 78 || June 29 || @ Brewers || 7–5 || Gallardo (8-3) || Myers (5-6) || Axford (8) || 32,907 || 30-48
|- bgcolor="bbffbb"
| 79 || June 30 || @ Brewers || 5–1 || Rodríguez (5-10) || Bush (3-6) || || 30,114 || 31-48
|-

|- bgcolor="bbffbb"
| 80 || July 1 || @ Padres || 6–3 (10) || Sampson (1-0) || Gregerson (2-3) || Lindstrom (19) || 18,618 || 32-48
|- bgcolor="ffbbbb"
| 81 || July 2 || @ Padres || 3–0 || Latos (9-4) || Lyon (5-2) || Bell (22) || 30,691 || 32-49
|- bgcolor="ffbbbb"
| 82 || July 3 || @ Padres || 1–0 || Adams (2-1) || Chacín (1-1) || Bell (23) || 40,042 || 32-50
|- bgcolor="ffbbbb"
| 83 || July 4 || @ Padres || 3–2 || Bell (4-0) || Lyon (5-3) || || 23,498 || 32-51
|- bgcolor="bbffbb"
| 84 || July 6 || Pirates || 6–2 || Rodríguez (6-10) || Lincoln (1-3) || || 23,210 || 33-51
|- bgcolor="bbffbb"
| 85 || July 7 || Pirates || 6–3 || Daigle (1-1) || McCutchen (1-4) || Lindstrom (20) || 23,123 || 34-51
|- bgcolor="bbffbb"
| 86 || July 8 || Pirates  || 2–0 || Oswalt (6-10) || Ohlendorf (1-7) || || 24,416 || 35-51
|- bgcolor="ffbbbb"
| 87 || July 9 || Cardinals || 8–0 || Wainwright (13-5) || Norris (2-6) || || 33,224 || 35-52
|- bgcolor="bbffbb"
| 88 || July 10 || Cardinals || 4–1 || Myers (6-6) || Suppan (0-5) || Lindstrom (21) || 37,518 || 36-52
|- bgcolor="ffbbbb"
| 89 || July 11 || Cardinals || 4–2 || Hawksworth (3-5) || Rodríguez (6-11) || Franklin (16) || 32,975 || 36-53
|- bgcolor="bbffbb"
| 90 || July 16 || @ Pirates || 5–2 || Myers (7-6) || Duke (3-9) || Lindstrom (22) || 23,373 || 37-53
|- bgcolor="ffbbbb"
| 91 || July 17 || @ Pirates || 12–6 || López (2-1) || Norris (2-7) || || 36,665 || 37-54
|- bgcolor="ffbbbb"
| 92 || July 18 || @ Pirates || 9–0 || Maholm (6-7) || Oswalt (6-11) || || 16,638 || 37-55
|- bgcolor="bbffbb"
| 93 || July 19 || @ Cubs || 14–7 || Rodríguez (1-3) || Silva (9-4) || || 35,514 || 38-55
|- bgcolor="ffbbbb"
| 94 || July 20 || @ Cubs || 11–5 || Cashner (1-3) || Lyon (5-4) || || 36,401 || 38-56
|- bgcolor="bbffbb"
| 95 || July 21 || @ Cubs || 4–3 (12) || Lyon (6-4) || Howry (1-3) || Chacín (1) || 38,533 || 39-56
|- bgcolor="ffbbbb"
| 96 || July 23 || Reds || 6–4 || Ondrusek (1-0) || Byrdak (1-1) || Cordero (27) || 30,575 || 39-57
|- bgcolor="ffbbbb"
| 97 || July 24 || Reds || 7–0 || Cueto (10-2) || Oswalt (6-12) || || 31,552 || 39-58
|- bgcolor="bbffbb"
| 98 || July 25 || Reds || 4–0 || Rodríguez (8-11) || Leake (7-2) || || 25,705 || 40-58
|- bgcolor="ffbbbb"
| 99 || July 26 || Cubs || 5–2 || Silva (10-4) || Wright (0-1) || Mármol (19) || 25,037 || 40-59
|- bgcolor="bbffbb"
| 100 || July 27 || Cubs || 6–1 || Myers (8-6) || Cashner (1-4) || || 28,047 || 41-59
|- bgcolor="bbffbb"
| 101 || July 28 || Cubs || 8–1 || Norris (3-7) || Wells (5-8) || || 28,046 || 42-59
|- bgcolor="bbffbb"
| 102 || July 30 || Brewers || 5–0 || Happ (2-0) || Parra (3-8) || || 27,456 || 43-59
|- bgcolor="bbffbb"
| 103 || July 31 || Brewers || 6–0 || Rodríguez (9-11) || Bush (5-9) || || 38,824 || 44-59
|-

|- bgcolor="bbffbb"
| 104 || August 1 || Brewers || 5–2 || Wright (1-1) || Loe (1-2) || Lyon (2) || 27,964 || 45-59
|- bgcolor="bbffbb"
| 105 || August 2 || @ Cardinals || 9–4 || Figueroa (3-1) || MacDougal (1-1) || || 43,369 || 46-59
|- bgcolor="bbffbb"
| 106 || August 3 || @ Cardinals || 18–4 || Norris (4-7) || García (9-5) || || 41,958 || 47-59
|- bgcolor="ffbbbb"
| 107 || August 4 || @ Cardinals || 8–4 || Carpenter (12-3) || Happ (2-1) || || 41,596 || 47-60
|- bgcolor="ffbbbb"
| 108 || August 6 || @ Brewers || 6–5 || Loe (2-2) || Lindstrom (2-2) || || 33,952 || 47-61
|- bgcolor="ffbbbb"
| 109 || August 7 || @ Brewers || 5–2 || Wolf (8-9) || Myers (8-7) || Hoffman (6) || 39,410 || 47-62
|- bgcolor="ffbbbb"
| 110 || August 8 || @ Brewers || 11–6 || Gallardo (11-5) || Wright (1-2) || || 39,339 || 47-63
|- bgcolor="bbffbb"
| 111 || August 9 || Braves || 10–4 || Byrdak (2-1) || Farnsworth (3-1) || || 34,684 || 48-63
|- bgcolor="ffbbbb"
| 112 || August 10 || Braves || 4–2 || Venters (4-0) || Lindstrom (2-3) || Wagner (28) || 34,155 || 48-64
|- bgcolor="ffbbbb"
| 113 || August 11 || Braves || 8–2 (10) || Wagner (6-2) || Lyon (6-5) || || 31,352 || 48-65
|- bgcolor="bbffbb"
| 114 || August 13 || Pirates || 4–1 || López (4-0) || Meek (4-4) || Lyon (3) || 36,124 || 49-65
|- bgcolor="bbffbb"
| 115 || August 14 || Pirates || 3–2 || Norris (5-7) || Maholm (7-11) || Lyon (4) || 31,608 || 50-65
|- bgcolor="bbffbb"
| 116 || August 15 || Pirates || 8–2 || Happ (3-1) || Karstens (2-9) || || 34,372 || 51-65
|- bgcolor="ffbbbb"
| 117 || August 16 || Mets || 3–1 || Feliciano (3-6) || Lindstrom (2-4) || Takahashi (1) || 22,688 || 51-66
|- bgcolor="bbffbb"
| 118 || August 17 || Mets || 4–3 || Melancon (1-0) || Santana (10-7) || López (1) || 26,279 || 52-66
|- bgcolor="ffbbbb"
| 119 || August 18 || Mets || 3–2 (14) || Dessens (3-1) || Chacin (1-2) || Acosta (1) || 23,403 || 52-67
|- bgcolor="bbffbb"
| 120 || August 19 || Mets || 3–2 || Norris (6-7) || Misch (0-2) || Lyon (5) || 26,271 || 53-67
|- bgcolor="ffbbbb"
| 121 || August 20 || @ Marlins || 9–0 || Sánchez (10-8) || Happ (3-2) || || 19,456 || 53-68
|- bgcolor="ffbbbb"
| 122 || August 21 || @ Marlins || 6–3 || Volstad (7-9) || Rodríguez (9-12) || || 21,721 || 53-69
|- bgcolor="bbffbb"
| 123 || August 22 || @ Marlins || 2–1 || López (5-0) || Veras (2-1) || Lyon (6) || 18,886 || 54-69
|- bgcolor="bbffbb"
| 124 || August 23 || @ Phillies || 3–2 || Myers (9-7) || Madson (4-2) || Lyon (7) || 44,081 || 55-69
|- bgcolor="bbffbb"
| 125 || August 24 || @ Phillies || 4–2 (16) || Fulchino (1-0) || Herndon (1-3) || || 45,494 || 56-69
|- bgcolor="bbffbb"
| 126 || August 25 || @ Phillies || 3–2 || Happ (4-2) || Halladay (16-9) || Lyon (8) || 44,657 || 57-69
|- bgcolor="bbffbb"
| 127 || August 26 || @ Phillies || 5–1 || Rodríguez (10-12) || Kendrick (8-7) || || 44,958 || 58-69
|- bgcolor="ffbbbb"
| 128 || August 27 || @ Mets || 2–1 || Pelfrey (13-7) || Figueroa (3-2) || Takahashi (2) || 30,178 || 58-70
|- bgcolor="bbffbb"
| 129 || August 28 || @ Mets || 4–1 || Myers (10-7) || Santana (10-9) || Lyon (9) || 33,024 || 59-70
|- bgcolor="ffbbbb"
| 130 || August 29 || @ Mets || 5–1 || Dickey (9-5) || Norris (6-8) || || 32,779 || 59-71
|- bgcolor="bbffbb"
| 131 || August 30 || Cardinals || 3–0 || Happ (5-2) || Westbrook (7-10) || || 23,140 || 60-71
|- bgcolor="bbffbb"
| 132 || August 31 || Cardinals || 3–0 || Rodríguez (11-12) || Carpenter (14-5) || Lyon (10) || 29,307 || 61-71
|-

|- bgcolor="bbffbb"
| 133 || September 1 || Cardinals || 5–2 || Figueroa (4-2) || Suppan (1-7) || Lyon (11) || 22,068 || 62-71
|- bgcolor="ffbbbb"
| 134 || September 3 || @ Diamondbacks || 4–3 || Heilman (5-5) || López (5-1) || Gutiérrez (7) || 24,748 || 62-72
|- bgcolor="bbffbb"
| 135 || September 4 || @ Diamondbacks || 6–5 || Melancon (2-0) || Heilman (5-6) || Lyon (12) || 31,605 || 63-72
|- bgcolor="bbffbb"
| 136 || September 5 || @ Diamondbacks || 3–2 || Happ (6-2) || López (5-13) || Lyon (13) || 25,416 || 64-72
|- bgcolor="ffbbbb"
| 137 || September 6 || @ Cubs || 5–4 || Cashner (2-5) || López (5-2) || Mármol (28) || 31,647 || 64-73
|- bgcolor="bbffbb"
| 138 || September 7 || @ Cubs || 7–3 || Figueroa (5-2) || Silva (10-6) || || 31,596 || 65-73
|- bgcolor="bbffbb"
| 139 || September 8 || @ Cubs || 4–0 || Myers (11-7) || Wells (6-13) || || 33,623 || 66-73
|- bgcolor="bbffbb"
| 140 || September 9 || Dodgers || 3–2 || Norris (7-8) || Lilly (8-10) || Lyon (14) || 28,081 || 67-73
|- bgcolor="ffbbbb"
| 141 || September 10 || Dodgers || 4–2 (11) || Dotel (3-3) || Abad (0-1) || || 31,010 || 67-74
|- bgcolor="ffbbbb"
| 142 || September 11 || Dodgers || 6–3 || Jansen (1-0) || Lyon (6-6) || Kuo (9) || 39,237 || 67-75
|- bgcolor="bbffbb"
| 143 || September 12 || Dodgers || 7–4 || Chacín (2-2) || Troncoso (1-3) || Lyon (15) || 30,240 || 68-75
|- bgcolor="bbffbb"
| 144 || September 13 || Brewers || 4–2 || Myers (12-7) || Kintzler (0-1) || Lindstrom (23) || 31,342 || 69-75
|- bgcolor="bbffbb"
| 145 || September 14 || Brewers || 3–2 || Norris (8-8) || Capuano (3-4) || Lyon (16) || 33,878 || 70-75
|- bgcolor="ffbbbb"
| 146 || September 15 || Brewers || 8–6 (10) || Axford (8-1) || Lindstrom (2-5) || || 30,791 || 70-76
|- bgcolor="bbffbb"
| 147 || September 17 || Reds || 5–3 || Fulchino (2-0) || Chapman (1-1) || Lyon (17) || 30,218 || 71-76
|- bgcolor="ffbbbb"
| 148 || September 18 || Reds || 11–1 || Arroyo (16-10) || Figueroa (5-3) || || 29,855 || 71-77
|- bgcolor="bbffbb"
| 149 || September 19 || Reds || 4–3 || Myers (13-7) || Wood (5-4) || Lyon (18) || 32,520 || 72-77
|- bgcolor="bbffbb"
| 150 || September 20 || @ Nationals || 8–2 || Norris (9-8) || Hernández (10-12) || || 10,999 || 73-77
|- bgcolor="ffbbbb"
| 151 || September 21 || @ Nationals || 8–4 || Clippard (10-6) || Paulino (1-9) || || 11,893 || 73-78
|- bgcolor="ffbbbb"
| 152 || September 22 || @ Nationals || 4–3 || Clippard (11-6) || Fulchino (2-1) || Burnett (3) || 12,213 || 73-79
|- bgcolor="ffbbbb"
| 153 || September 23 || @ Nationals || 7–2 || Detwiler (1-2) || Figueroa (5-4) || || 14,633 || 73-80
|- bgcolor="bbffbb"
| 154 || September 24 || @ Pirates || 10–7 || Myers (14-7) || Leroux (0-1) || Lyon (19) || 22,279 || 74-80
|- bgcolor="ffbbbb"
| 155 || September 25 || @ Pirates || 6–4 || Duke (8-14) || Norris (9-9) || Hanrahan (6) || 25,350 || 74-81
|- bgcolor="ffbbbb"
| 156 || September 26 || @ Pirates || 9–3 || Maholm (9-15) || Happ (6-3) || || 23,208 || 74-82
|- bgcolor="ffbbbb"
| 157 || September 28 || @ Reds || 3–2 || Chapman (2-2) || Byrdak (2-2) || || 30,151 || 74-83
|- bgcolor="bbffbb"
| 158 || September 29 || @ Reds || 2–0 || Figueroa (6-4) || Cueto (12-7) || Lyon (20) || 14,760 || 75-83
|- bgcolor="ffbbbb"
| 159 || September 30 || @ Reds || 9–1 || Arroyo (17-10) || Myers (14-8) || || 17,558 || 75-84
|- bgcolor="ffbbbb"
| 160 || October 1 || Cubs || 2–0 || Coleman (4-2) || Norris (9-10) || Mármol (38) || 33,869 || 75-85
|- bgcolor="ffbbbb"
| 161 || October 2 || Cubs || 8–3 || Zambrano (11-6) || Happ (6-4) || || 36,098 || 75-86
|- bgcolor="bbffbb"
| 162 || October 3 || Cubs || 4–0 || Figueroa (7-4) || Dempster (15-12) || || 31,105 || 76-86
|-

Roster

Player stats

Batting
Note: G = Games played; AB = At bats; R = Runs scored; H = Hits; 2B = Doubles; 3B = Triples; HR = Home runs; RBI = Runs batted in; AVG = Batting average; SB = Stolen bases

Pitching

Note: W = Wins; L = Losses; ERA = Earned run average; G = Games pitched; GS = Games started; SV = Saves; IP = Innings pitched; R = Runs allowed; ER = Earned runs allowed; BB = Walks allowed; K = Strikeouts

Farm system

LEAGUE CHAMPIONS: Tri-City

References

External links

2010 Houston Astros season official site
2010 Houston Astros season at Baseball Reference

Houston Astros seasons
Houston Astros
2010 in sports in Texas